The  is a long-running prime-time popular television Jidaigeki series about assassins in Japan. Hissatsu Shikakenin is based on Shōtarō Ikenami's novel Shiokinin Fujieda Baian, but its sequels are only inspired by it. The series still continues as an annual two-hour special drama.

List of TV series
Source:

List of TV special dramas
 Tokubetsuhen Hissatsu Shigotonin Kyofuno Ooshigoto Mito Owari Kishu (1981)
 Hissatsu series Jutsushunen Kinen specialShigotonin Daishūgoū (1982)
 Hissatsu Gendaiban Mondo no shison ga Kyotoni Arawareta (1982)
 Toshiwasure Hissatsu Special Shigotonin Ahensenso e Yuku (1983)
 Hissatsu Shigotonin Igaiden Mondo Dainana Kiheitaito Tatakau (1985)
 Shinshun Shigotonin Special HissatsuChoushingura (1987)
 Hissatsu Shigotonin waido Tairo Goroshi (1987)
 Hissatsu wide shinshun Hisashiburi Mondo Yume no Hatsushigoto Akunin Check! (1988)
 Hissatsu special Haru Yonimo Fushigina Ooshigoto (1991)
 Hissatsu special Shinshun Sen Ritsu Youkai sareru Mondo Dosuru? (1992)
 Hissatsu Shigotonin 2007
 Hissatsu Shigotonin 2010
 Hissatsu Shigotonin 2012
 Hissatsu Shigotonin 2013
 Hissatsu Shigotonin 2014
 Hissatsu Shigotonin 2015
 Hissatsu Shigotonin 2016
 Hissatsu Shigotonin 2018
 Hissatsu Shigotonin 2019
 Hissatsu Shigotonin 2020

List of films
Hissatsu Shikakenin (1973) 
Hissatsu Shikakenin Baian Arijigoku (1973)
Hissatsu Shikakenin Shunsetsu shikakebari (1974)
Hissatsu: Sure Death (1984)
Hissatsu! Braunkan no Kaibutsutachi (1985)
Hissatsu! III Ura ka Omote ka (1986), directed by Eiichi Kudo
Sure Death 4: Revenge (1987), directed by Kinji Fukasaku
Hissatsu!5 Ōgon no Chi (1991), directed by Toshio Masuda
Hissatsu! Mondo Shisu (1996)
Hissatsu Shimatsunin (1998)
Hissatsu! Shamisenya no Yuji (1999)

References

Jidaigeki television series
Japanese television series